The 1903 VMI Keydets football team represented the Virginia Military Institute (VMI) in their 13th season of organized football. The Keydets finished a short year at 2–1 led by first-year head coach Bill Roper.

Schedule

References

VMI
VMI Keydets football seasons
VMI Keydets football